The 2017 CISM World Football Cup is an international football tournament hosted by Oman from 15 to 28 January 2017.

Group A

Oman
Coach:  Muhannad Saeed Al-Adwi

Guinea
Coach:  Hamidou Camara

Bahrain
Coach:  Miroslav Soukup

France
Coach:  Jeremy Chapeleur

Group B

Algeria
Coach:  Mohamed Boutadjine

Germany
Coach:  Oliver Unsöld

Iran
Coach:  Gholam Hossein Peyrovani

North Korea
Coach:  Kim Chung

Group C

Ireland
Coach:  Thomas Hewitt

Mali
Coach:  Bréhima Diallo

Qatar
Coach:  Abdulqadir Al-Meghaissib

United States
Coach:  Derrick Weyand

Group D

Egypt
Coach:  Mohamed Omar

Poland
Coach:  Tomasz Mucha

Canada
Coach:  Marcelo Plala

Syria
Coach:  Anas Makhlouf

External links
 Official website of the competition

2017 Squads
2017 in Omani sport